Amphidasya elegans is a species of flowering plants in the family Rubiaceae. It is found in Colombia and Ecuador.

References

External links 

 Amphidasya elegans at The Plant List

Plants described in 2001
Urophylleae
Flora of Colombia
Flora of Ecuador